The Polar Times is the publication of  American Polar Society. It was first published by August Howard in 1935. In 1946 the Polar Times Glacier was named in honor of the publication.

External links
1982 scanned copy

References

American Polar Society
Magazines established in 1935